Kimiko Date-Krumm and Casey Dellacqua were the defending champions, but Dellacqua decided not to participate.  Date-Krumm played alongside Ajla Tomljanović, but lost to Alla Kudryavtseva and Anastasia Rodionova in the quarterfinals.

Peng Shuai and Zhang Shuai won the title, defeating Kudryavtseva and Rodionova in the final, 3–6, 7–6(7–5), [10–6].

Seeds

Draw

Draw

References
 Main Draw

Doubles
PTT Pattaya Open - Doubles
 in women's tennis